Lycée Français de Saint Domingue is a French international school in Santo Domingo, Dominican Republic.

It serves levels maternelle (preschool), starting from petite section, through lycée (senior high school).

References

External links

  Lycée Français de Saint Domingue

International schools in the Dominican Republic
Schools in Santo Domingo
Santo Domingo